Aas or Ås may refer to:

Alexander Aas (born 1978), Norwegian football defender
Alf-Jørgen Aas (1915–1981), Norwegian painter
Arto Aas (born 1980), Estonian politician
Berit Ås (born 1928), Norwegian politician
Einar Jan Aas (born 1955), Norwegian footballer
Erling Aas-Eng (born 1965), Norwegian politician
Johan Aas (born 1960), Norwegian politician
Kari Aas (1886–1978), Norwegian teacher and Scout leader 
Karl Aas (1899–1943), Norwegian gymnast
Kätlin Aas (born 1992), Estonian model
Kim Aas (born 1970), Danish politician
Nils Aas (1933–2004), Norwegian sculptor
Per Almar Aas (1929–2014), Norwegian politician
Rene Aas (born 1969), Estonian motorcycle racer
Roald Aas (1928–2012), Norwegian speed skater and cyclist
Taavi Aas (born 1966), Estonian politician, acting Mayor of Tallinn September 2015
Th. Valentin Aass (1887–1961), Norwegian sailboat racer

See also 
Ås (disambiguation)

Norwegian-language surnames
Estonian-language surnames